Orla Walsh is a champion Irish track cyclist. She competed individually in the women's scratch, as well as part of the Irish team, at the 2019 European Games in the team pursuit. , she holds the Irish record for the 500m time trial at 36.220. She started cycling in her twenties, her transition into elite sportswoman was the subject of a 2021 Global Cycling Network documentary Cycling Changed My Life: Orla Walsh.

References

External links

1989 births
Living people
Irish female cyclists
Place of birth missing (living people)
21st-century Irish women